Leif Erik "Honken" Holmqvist (born November 12, 1942) is a retired Swedish ice hockey goaltender.  He is one of only three players to win the Golden Puck award twice, which he did while playing for AIK.

Holmqvist played a season in England for the London Lions and one in the United States for the Indianapolis Racers.

He competed as a member of the Sweden men's national ice hockey team at the 1968 and 1972 Winter Olympics.

Holmqvist was named best goaltender at the 1969 IIHF World Championships. After retiring from hockey, Holmqvist coached in the Norwegian National League.

He was inducted into the IIHF Hall of Fame in 1999.

References

External links

A to Z Encyclopedia of Ice Hockey 

1942 births
AIK IF players
HV71 players
Indianapolis Racers players
Living people
London Lions (ice hockey) players
People from Gävle
Swedish expatriate sportspeople in the United Kingdom
Swedish expatriate ice hockey players in the United States
Swedish ice hockey goaltenders
Ice hockey players with retired numbers
Olympic ice hockey players of Sweden
Ice hockey players at the 1968 Winter Olympics
Ice hockey players at the 1972 Winter Olympics
IIHF Hall of Fame inductees
Sportspeople from Gävleborg County